Bolivia–Iran relations refer to foreign relations between Bolivia and Iran. Iran has an embassy in La Paz. Bolivia has an embassy in Tehran. Both countries are members of the Non-Aligned Movement and Group of 77.

History
The two countries formed full diplomatic relations in 2007.

Economic relations
Iran's ambassador to Bolivia said his country would open two low-cost public health clinics in the country, which is South America's poorest. Iranian business attache Hojjatollah Soltani said his country planned to use Bolivia as a base for future Red Crescent medical programmes across the continent.

In 2010, Bolivian President Evo Morales visited Iran and sought further investments in Bolivia, and "expand ties, promote investments, and further enhance cooperation." The trip also entailed discussion for a planned $287 million Iranian investment in Bolivia. This was preceded by a line of credit Iran extended to Bolivia for another $287 million as development aid, in particular for mineral exploration and the textile industry.

Political relations

During another visit to Iran in 2010, together with the Iranian President Mahmoud Ahmadinejad he said there was a need to "strengthen the resistance front formed by independent and freedom-seeking nations to fight against imperialism and global hegemony." Bolivia also denied it had any joint uranium exploration deals with Iran in the face of international pressure on Iran's nuclear programme.

Bilateral visits
On a visit to Iran in 2008, Bolivian President Morales secured Iranian assistance in promotion of hydrocarbon development. An Iranian commission would help Bolivia to study different options of promoting petro-chemistry and agribusiness production, as well as seek to quicken an investment of about $1.1 billion that Iranian President Ahmadnenijad promised on his visit to Bolivia in September, 2007. Bolivia described the trip as an attempt to reach out to other states "rejected by the international community." Morales added that the two are as "two friendly and revolutionary countries" that are strengthening ties; adding that Iran's efforts to provide economic and political backing would "support the peasant struggle in Latin America." Iran's investments would boost bilateral economic and agricultural ties, from milk processing plants, to television and radio stations, including an agreement to provide Bolivian state television with Spanish-language programming, to funding hydroelectric exploration. Reports also indicated an interest in Bolivia's reserves of uranium and lithium for use in Iranian nuclear projects. Morales previously joked that he too is a part of the "axis of evil."

He visited Iran again in 2010, and was expected to sign agreements on cooperation in cement production, industrial machinery, and food industry projects.

Iranian Defense Minister General Ahmad Vahidi visited Bolivia at the behest of his Bolivian counterpart Maria Cecilia Chacon. After attending a military ceremony he said that "Latin America is no longer the US' backyard and Iran will enhance its constructive relations with the regional countries." He also called the visit "successful" and that the two states would enhance their "growing ties."

See also 
 Foreign relations of Bolivia 
 Foreign relations of Iran

References

Iran
Bolivia